Cephetola mercedes is a butterfly in the family Lycaenidae. It is found in Ivory Coast, Ghana, Nigeria and Cameroon. Its habitat consists of forests.

Subspecies
Cephetola mercedes mercedes (Nigeria: south and Cross River loop, western Cameroon)
Cephetola mercedes dejeani Libert, 1999  (central Cameroon)
Cephetola mercedes ivoriensis (Jackson, 1967)  (Ivory Coast, Ghana)

References

Butterflies described in 1904
Poritiinae